Jaap van Zweden  (born 12 December 1960) is a Dutch conductor and violinist. He is currently music director of the Hong Kong Philharmonic Orchestra and of the New York Philharmonic, and music director-designate of the Seoul Philharmonic.

Biography
Van Zweden was born in Amsterdam, Netherlands. His father, a pianist, encouraged him to begin violin studies at age five, and he studied music in Amsterdam, where his teachers included Louise Wijngaarden and Davina van Wely. At age 15, he won the Oskar Back violin competition; this allowed him to attend the Juilliard School in the United States, where he studied with Dorothy DeLay.

Career
In 1979, at age 18, van Zweden became one of the two first chairs (leaders) of the Concertgebouw Orchestra. He was the youngest violinist ever to assume that position, which he held until 1995. He performed as a soloist with many other orchestras as well.

Van Zweden began to work as a conductor after Leonard Bernstein invited him to lead an orchestra rehearsal in Berlin. He has stated that he learned much about conducting from observing the various conductors who led concerts of the Concertgebouw Orchestra. He conducted smaller ensembles initially, and became a full-time conductor in 1997. His first Dutch conducting post was as chief conductor with the Orkest van het Oosten (Orchestra of the East, or the Netherlands Symphony Orchestra) in Enschede, the Netherlands. He served in this post from 1996 through 2000. Van Zweden was chief conductor of the Residentie Orchestra in The Hague from 2000 until 2005, and he recorded the complete symphonies of Ludwig van Beethoven with them. In 2005 he became chief conductor and artistic leader of the Radio Filharmonisch Orkest (RFO; Netherlands Radio Philharmonic) in Hilversum. In February 2007 he extended his RFO contract through 2013. In August 2010, the orchestra announced that van Zweden would step down from the RFO chief conductorship in 2012 and take the position of honorary guest conductor. Van Zweden served as chief conductor of the Antwerp Symphony Orchestra from 2008 to 2011.

Outside Europe, van Zweden made his U.S. conducting debut with the St. Louis Symphony in 1996. His second US guest-conducting appearance was with the Dallas Symphony Orchestra in February 2006, a concert that was highly acclaimed. Based on this engagement the Dallas Symphony named Van Zweden their next music director after Andrew Litton, effective with the 2008/09 season. His initial contract was for four years, where in the first year he was scheduled to conduct 12 weeks of subscription concerts and then for 15 weeks in the subsequent three years. For the 2007–2008 season, he held the title of music director-designate.  In October 2009, the Dallas Symphony announced the extension of his contract through the 2015–2016 season. In November 2013, the orchestra announced a further extension of his contract through 2019.  In January 2016, the Dallas Symphony announced a revised conclusion of van Zweden's tenure for the close of the 2017–2018 season, one season earlier than his most recent Dallas contract.  With the 2018–2019 season, van Zweden took the title of conductor laureate of the Dallas Symphony, for the period from 2018 until 2021.

In January 2012, the Hong Kong Philharmonic Orchestra (HK Phil) announced the appointment of van Zweden as its next music director, with an initial contract of four years, starting 1 August 2012. He made his debut as the music director of the orchestra on 28 September 2012. In June 2016, van Zweden extended his contract with the HK Phil through the 2021–2022 season.  In June 2020, the HK Phil announced the further extension of van Zweden's contract through the 2023–2024 season, at which time he is scheduled to stand down from the post and to take the title of conductor laureate.

Van Zweden first guest-conducted the New York Philharmonic in April 2012. He returned for subsequent engagements in November 2014 and October 2015. In January 2016, the New York Philharmonic announced the appointment of van Zweden as its next music director, effective with the 2018/19 season, with an initial contract of five years. Van Zweden served as music director designate for the 2017/18 season.  In September 2021, van Zweden stated his intention to stand down from the New York Philharmonic music directorship at the close of the 2023–2024 season.

In September 2022, the Seoul Philharmonic Orchestra announced the appointment of van Zweden as its next music director, effective January 2024, with an initial contract of 5 years.

Personal life
Since 1983, van Zweden has been married to the artist Aaltje van Zweden–van Buuren. They have a daughter, Anna-Sophia, and three sons, Daniel, Benjamin and Alexander. The van Zwedens have a particular interest in autism, as their son Benjamin is autistic. In 2000, the van Zwedens set up the Papageno Foundation to provide autistic children with music therapy.  During the COVID-19 pandemic, van Zweden contracted SARS-CoV-2 and subsequently recovered.

References

External links

 
 Papageno Foundation website (Dutch language)
 RFO conductors profile

1960 births
Living people
Dutch conductors (music)
Male conductors (music)
Dutch classical violinists
Male classical violinists
Dutch expatriates in Hong Kong
Dutch expatriates in the United States
Concertmasters
20th-century conductors (music)
21st-century conductors (music)
Musicians from Amsterdam
Players of the Royal Concertgebouw Orchestra
Autism activists
21st-century classical violinists